The Bold, the Corrupt, and the Beautiful (Bloody Guanyin) is a 2017 Taiwanese crime drama film written and directed by Yang Ya-che, set in Taiwan in the 1980s. The film stars Kara Hui, Wu Ke-xi and Vicky Chen. It premiered on October 15, 2017, at the 22nd Busan International Film Festival.

Plot
Madame Tang, the wife of a general, is an antique dealer who lives in a mansion with her two daughters. Dealing with high ranking government officials and the rich, their lives are disrupted when the family of their close friend is murdered. Soon, the murder escalates into a game of survival between those who are involved, in which the person with the last laugh is the winner.

Cast

 Kara Hui as Madame Tang  
 Wu Ke-xi as Tang Ning 
 Vicky Chen as Tang Chen
 Sally Chen as Director
 Ko Chia-yen as Tang Chen (adult)
 Moon Wang as Wife of county magistrate
 Wen Chen-ling as Lin Pien-pien 
 Carolyn Chen as Assistant of city councilor
 Mariko Okubo as Legislator Lin's wife
 Jun Fu as Police officer Liao
 Ting Chiang as Secretary-general
 Yin Chao-te as Legislator Lin
 Showlen Maya as Singer
 Ying Wei-min as Gu Xianzong
  as Duan Yi
 Kenny Yan as Jiayuan
 Lee Chuan as Tang Chen's assistant
 Lin Chih-ju
 Wu Shu-wei 
 Yang Hsiu-ching

Awards and nominations

References

External links

Taiwanese crime drama films
2017 crime drama films
2017 psychological thriller films
2010s Mandarin-language films